Jardim Itu-Sabará is a neighbourhood (bairro) in the city of Porto Alegre, the state capital of Rio Grande do Sul, Brazil. It was created by Law 3193 from October 29, 1968.

The Jardim Itu-Sabará area begun its division into lots during the 1950s.

References

External links
 Porto Alegre City Homepage

Neighbourhoods in Porto Alegre